Spirit They're Gone, Spirit They've Vanished is the first collaborative studio album by Avey Tare (David Portner) and Panda Bear (Noah Lennox), released in August 2000. It was later retroactively classified as the debut album by Portner and Lennox's group Animal Collective. The album was first released as a CD on the band's own Animal label (now known as Paw Tracks) with only 2000 copies produced.

It was reissued as a double CD along with Danse Manatee in 2003 on FatCat Records, and later on limited edition vinyl through FatCat. Both UK and US pressings used direct metal mastering.

The album will be reissued again on May 12th, 2023 on 3xLP, 2xLP, and 2xCD. It was remastered by Dave Cooley, and all versions will include a previously unreleased 5-song EP titled A Night at Mr. Raindrop's Holistic Supermarket, created during the same period as Spirit. Along with this announcement, the remastered version of "Chocolate Girl" was released, alongside "Untitled #1", a song from the previously unreleased EP.

Background 

All of the songs were written by Avey Tare (David Portner) from 1997 to 1999, except for "Penny Dreadfuls" which was written when he was 16 years old. The process was strongly inspired by his move from Baltimore to New York, which he described as a "dark time" with Brian Weitz (Geologist) being his only friend in the city. Portner and Panda Bear (Noah Lennox) recorded the acoustic guitar and the drums live onto a Tascam 48 eight-track reel-to-reel in Portner's bedroom in Maryland during the summer of 1999. The piano songs along with overdubs were recorded in Portner's parents' living room.
Portner wanted the guitar to be "jangled to create this fluttering feeling".

An old Roland SH-2 synthesizer, which Weitz's brother found stored in a camp, was used for the bass sounds. The drums were played with brushes to emulate the albums Ocean Rain and Forever Changes. Avey Tare would dictate what he wanted the rhythm to be through beatboxing. Other sounds, such as the majority of "Spirit They've Vanished", were created through the use of feedback loops.

Future Animal Collective member Deakin (Josh Dibb) helped with the promotion and sent packages to record companies. Portner recalled, "Southern Records called us back immediately and said ‘Is there something wrong with this? This music makes our dogs run out of the room’!"

Release 

The original cover art was found by Avey Tare, who considered it fitting. The art was later discovered to be an illustration by Dorothy P. Lathrop from the book Stars To-Night: Verses New and Old for Boys and Girls by Sara Teasdale. The album was intended to be released under Avey Tare's name alone, but he was so impressed by Panda Bear's drumming that he added Panda's name on the front cover. This method of choosing monikers for Animal Collective's recorded output—naming themselves after who played on each respective album—would last until 2003's Campfire Songs.

Included with the original release and later vinyl pressings was an insert with the following story:

The title is a quote uttered by Mr. Magoo in Mister Magoo's Christmas Carol.

Songs from this album have occasionally been performed live in the following years. "Chocolate Girl" was re-worked for performances during 2008. The final passages of "Alvin Row" were performed frequently on the 2016-2017 tour and Avey Tare performed a solo version of "La Rapet" on electric guitar during a live-stream in June 2020.

Track listing 

A Night at Mr. Raindrop's Holistic Supermarket

There has been some confusion about the album's track listing. On the original, limited release, the untitled track #3 was not listed along with the other songs. Since the track listing gave no corresponding track numbers to the rest of the songs, it was incorrectly assumed that tracks #3-9 were actually titled as tracks #4-10 are here, and that "Alvin Row" had no title. This error appears in nearly every review of Spirit following its initial release in 2000. The 2003 FatCat reissue cleared up this misunderstanding by numbering the songs and leaving a blank space for track #3.

"Dreams" is a cover of the Fleetwood Mac song of the same name.

Personnel 
 Avey Tare – vocals, acoustic guitar, piano, synthesizers, tapes
 Panda Bear – "perfect percussion" (drums)

References 

2000 debut albums
Animal Collective albums
New Weird America albums
FatCat Records albums
Avey Tare albums
Panda Bear (musician) albums
Albums recorded in a home studio